Planet Holiday Hotel & Residence (widely known as Planet Holiday) is an  tall high-rise building in Sei Jodoh, Batam. At completion in 2004, it became the tallest building in Batam, which held for about 7 years, before being surpassed by Batam City Condominium as the tallest building in Batam in 2011.

See also 
 Batam
 List of tallest buildings in Batam

References 

Hotels in Indonesia
Hotel buildings completed in 2004
Batam
Buildings and structures in the Riau Islands